{{speciesbox
|genus = Gymnaciura
|species = austeni
|authority = (Munro, 1935)
|display_parents = 3
|synonyms = *Spheniscomyia neavei var. chyuluensis Munro, 1939
Aciura distigmoides Hering, 1941
Gymnaciura austeni f. concisa Munro, 1955
}}Gymnaciura austeni is a species of tephritid or fruit flies in the genus Gymnaciura'' of the family Tephritidae.

Distribution
Eritrea, Sierra Leone, Kenya, Tanzania, Zimbabwe, Madagascar.

References

 
 

Tephritinae
Insects described in 1935
Diptera of Africa